2023 Malaysia Premier Futsal League is the 4th season of the Malaysia Premier Futsal League, and the 14th season of Malaysian futsal league overall.

Selangor MAC are the two-time defending champions, having won both the 2019 and 2022 season.

Teams 
Fourteen teams are competing in the league – the eleven teams from the previous season and the three new teams. The three new teams are Johor Darul Ta'zim, Sabah and PFA Odin Sarawak.

Stadiums and locations

Personnel

Foreign players

Format 
The 2023 Malaysia Premier Futsal League season for the men's category will start on Saturday, 18 February 2023 with the participation of 14 teams divided into two groups according to zones. Group A consists of ATM, Kedah, KPT-PST Mustangs, Pahang Rangers, Penang, Sabah and Terengganu. While Group B features Johor Darul Ta'zim, KL City, Kuala Lumpur, PFA Odin Sarawak, Selangor MAC, Selangor TOT United and Shah Alam City. The competition is conducted in a two-round league format (home & away) at the team's chosen venue where each team will play 12 games. The top four teams of Group A and B will then advance to the knockout round which is the Quarter-Finals in one round (the venue of the match will be drawn) and the Semi-Finals and Finals reciprocally at the venue of the team's choice.

Group stage

Table

Group A

Group B

Positions by round

Group A

Group B

Results

Group A

Group B

Results by round

Group A

Group B

Knockout stage

Bracket

Quarter-finals 
Match venue will be drawn. The quarter-finals will be played on 8 July 2023.

|}

Semi-finals 
The first legs will be played on 11 July 2023 and the second legs will be played on 22 July 2023.

|}

Final 
The first legs will be played on 29 July 2023 and the second legs will be played on 5 August 2023.

|}

Season statistics 
As of matches played on 5 March 2023.

Top scorers

Hat-tricks

Clean sheets

Attendances

References 

Futsal in Malaysia